The 1953 World Fencing Championships were held in Brussels, Belgium.

Medal table

Medal summary

Men's events

Women's events

References

1953 in Belgian sport
1953 in fencing
F
Sports competitions in Brussels
World Fencing Championships
1950s in Brussels